The San Francisco Film Critics Circle Award for Best Adapted Screenplay is given by the San Francisco Film Critics Circle (since 2006).

Winners

2000s

2010s

References 

San Francisco Film Critics Circle Awards
Screenwriting awards for film